Inga fastuosa is a species of plant in the family Fabaceae. It is found in Brazil, the Caribbean, and Venezuela.

References

External links

fastuosa